Meazza is an Italian surname. Notable people with the surname include:

 Giuseppe Meazza (1910–1979), Italian footballer and manager
 Stadio Giuseppe Meazza
 Luca Meazza (born 1965), Italian footballer
 Max Meazza (born 1952), singer/songwriter

Italian-language surnames